The phrase She Who Must Be Obeyed originally derives from the lead character of Henry Rider Haggard's 1886 novel She: A History of Adventure.

It also may refer to
 slang for "my wife", implying she is in charge.
 fictional characters:
 Hilda Rumpole, the wife of Horace Rumpole of Rumpole of the Bailey (first broadcast in 1975)
 sculpture:
 She Who Must Be Obeyed (sculpture),  a 1975 sculpture by Tony Smith, in Washington, D.C.
Virginia Woolf, To the Lighthouse, of Mrs. Ramsay, “she whose wishes must be obeyed”
Elisabeth Sanxay Holding in The Strange Crime in Bermuda, “She-Who-Must-Be-Obeyed,”